Lepidochrysops fulvescens is a butterfly in the family Lycaenidae. It is found in the highlands of Angola.

Adults have been recorded in October and November.

References

Butterflies described in 1961
Lepidochrysops
Endemic fauna of Angola
Butterflies of Africa